Raheem Nathaniel Anfernee Edwards (born July 17, 1995) is a Canadian professional soccer player who plays as a left winger or wing-back for LA Galaxy in Major League Soccer.

Club career

League1 Ontario
In 2014, Edwards joined the new League1 Ontario signing with Internacional de Toronto and then joined ANB Futbol midway through the season after Internacional was expelled from the league.

Toronto FC II
In 2015, Edwards signed his first professional contract with Toronto FC II, Toronto FC's reserve team. He made his debut as a substitute on March 28 against FC Montreal. Edwards played two full seasons with the USL side, scoring eight goals and assisting on five occasions.

Toronto FC
In June 2016, Edwards signed a short-term agreement which allowed him to play in cup games with the first team. On June 29, 2016, Edwards made his first team debut during the 2016 Canadian Championship, coming on for Jonathan Osorio in the second half of the second leg of the final. Raheem made his Major League Soccer debut when he entered in the 88th minute TFC's 1–1 draw at home to Seattle Sounders FC on July 2, 2016. In March 2017, Edwards signed a full first team contract with Toronto FC prior to the 2017 season.

Montreal Impact
On December 12, 2017, Edwards was selected by Los Angeles FC in the 2017 MLS Expansion Draft. He was then immediately traded with fellow expansion draftee Jukka Raitala to Montreal Impact on exchange for defender Laurent Ciman. Edwards would make his Impact debut against the Vancouver Whitecaps during the 2018 season opener, and would score his first goal for the Impact in the following game against the Columbus Crew.

Chicago Fire
On July 17, 2018, Edwards was traded to the Chicago Fire in exchange for $400,000 in Targeted Allocation Money. He made his debut four days later on July 21, assisting on a Nemanja Nikolić goal in a 2–1 defeat to his former club Toronto FC.

Minnesota United
On February 11, 2020, Edwards was again traded within Major League Soccer, this time to Minnesota United in exchange for Wyatt Omsberg. He made his debut on March 7 against the San Jose Earthquakes.

Los Angeles FC
On December 17, 2020, Edwards was selected by Los Angeles FC in the first stage of the 2020 MLS Re-Entry Draft. Upon completion of the 2021 season, Edwards' option for the 2022 season would not be picked up by Los Angeles, making him a free agent.

LA Galaxy
On January 7, 2022, Edwards signed a three-year deal with LA Galaxy. With this transfer, Edwards became the first LAFC player to join rivals LA Galaxy immediately after a season with LAFC. He made his debut in the Galaxy's season opener against New York City FC on February 27, where he assisted Chicharito's winning goal in a 1-0 victory.

International career

Youth
Born in Canada, Edwards is of Jamaican descent. He made his debut for the Canadian program with the U23 side at the 2015 Pan American Games. He appeared in his first match against Brazil's U23 side as a substitute.

In May 2016, Edwards was called to Canada's U23 national team for a pair of friendlies against Guyana and Grenada. He scored in both games, and received Man of the Match honors with a goal and three assists in the U23's 5–1 victory against Guyana's full national team on May 15, 2016.

Senior
Edwards made his debut for the Canadian senior team against Curaçao on June 13, 2017. On June 27, he was named to the 2017 CONCACAF Gold Cup squad.

Career statistics

Club

International

Honours
Toronto FC
MLS Cup: 2017
Supporters' Shield: 2017
Canadian Championship: 2016, 2017
Eastern Conference (Playoffs): 2016, 2017
Trillium Cup: 2016, 2017

References

External links

1995 births
Living people
2017 CONCACAF Gold Cup players
Association football midfielders
Black Canadian soccer players
Canadian sportspeople of Jamaican descent
Canadian soccer players
Canada men's under-23 international soccer players
Canada men's international soccer players
Chicago Fire FC players
Minnesota United FC players
Footballers at the 2015 Pan American Games
Major League Soccer players
CF Montréal players
Soccer players from Toronto
Toronto FC players
Toronto FC II players
USL Championship players
Pan American Games competitors for Canada
ANB Futbol players
Los Angeles FC players
LA Galaxy players
Las Vegas Lights FC players
Canadian expatriate sportspeople in the United States
Expatriate soccer players in the United States
Canadian expatriate soccer players
Sheridan College alumni
University and college soccer players in Canada